Ocotea lancilimba is a species of plant in the family Lauraceae. It is an evergreen tree in the genus Ocotea.  It is endemic to Mauritius.  Its natural habitat is subtropical or tropical dry forests.

References

lancilimba
Endemic flora of Mauritius
Trees of Africa
Critically endangered flora of Africa
Taxonomy articles created by Polbot